Cumming Scott Burton (May 12, 1936 — August 24, 2015) was a Canadian professional ice hockey right winger who played three seasons in the National Hockey League for the Detroit Red Wings between 1956 and 1959. The rest of his career, which lasted from 1956 to 1968, was spent in different minor leagues.

Playing career
Burton is the cousin of Larry Aurie and wore #6 in Aurie's honor, having received special permission to do so while with the Red Wings as the number had been retired by team owner James Norris.  The status of Aurie's #6 has become controversial for the Wings as a banner for it does not hang in Joe Louis Arena unlike the other numbers that have been retired by the team.  In regard to this Burton has been quoted as saying "Not hanging up Larry's number would be compared to the Yankees' not retiring Lou Gehrig's number, just because he was from the 1930s and now forgotten just because it's all old stuff now. It's like saying that war heroes don't mean anything, just because they're not around anymore."

Post-playing career
Following his retirement from hockey, he worked as a sports broadcaster for CKSO-TV in his hometown of Sudbury. He died on August 24, 2015.

Career statistics

Regular season and playoffs

References

External links
 

1936 births
2015 deaths
Canadian ice hockey right wingers
Canadian television sportscasters
Charlotte Checkers (EHL) players
Edmonton Flyers (WHL) players
Detroit Red Wings players
Hamilton Tiger Cubs players
Ice hockey people from Ontario
Jacksonville Rockets players
Pittsburgh Hornets players
Seattle Totems (WHL) players
Sportspeople from Greater Sudbury
Sudbury Wolves (EPHL) players
Windsor Spitfires players
20th-century Canadian people